Sadyattes is a genus of stick insects in the subfamily Platycraninae and tribe Stephanacridini. Species have a known distribution from Sumatra and Borneo.

Species
Sadyattes includes the following species:
 Sadyattes annulatus (Redtenbacher, 1908)
 Sadyattes borrii Stål, 1875 - type species
 Sadyattes enganensis (Redtenbacher, 1908)
 Sadyattes nigricornis (Redtenbacher, 1908)

References

External Links

Phasmatodea genera
Phasmatidae
Phasmatodea of Asia